Alexander Coutts (April 17, 1824 – August 14, 1881) was a Scottish-born farmer and politician in Ontario, Canada. He represented Kent West in the Legislative Assembly of Ontario from 1875 to 1879 as a Conservative.

He was born in Tullich, Aberdeenshire, the son of John Coutts and Ann McDonald, and arrived in Canada with his family in 1834. Coutts was educated in Tilbury East. In 1856, he married Jane McVean. Coutts served 18 years on the township council for Tilbury East, serving as reeve for 12 years.

He died in Tilbury East at the age of 57.

References

External links

1824 births
1881 deaths
Progressive Conservative Party of Ontario MPPs